Erba (previously Erba-Incino, as it was formed by the union of these two places, together with some smaller districts) is a comune (municipality) of some 16,000 inhabitants in the Province of Como in the Italian region Lombardy.

It received the honorary title of city with a presidential decree on May 12, 1970.

Erba borders the following municipalities: Albavilla, Caslino d'Erba, Castelmarte, Eupilio, Faggeto Lario, Longone al Segrino, Merone, Monguzzo, Ponte Lambro, Proserpio.

Massacre of Erba 
Erba was the site of the murder of four people including a 2-year old baby in December 2006, an event known as the "Massacre of Erba".  A married couple, the victims' neighbors, were arrested for the murders.

Main sights

Romanesque church of Sant'Eufemia, with the 11th-century bell tower.
Monument to World War I Victims, by Giuseppe Terragni (c. 1930)
Torre di Incino, with remains of a medieval castle.
Natural grotto of the Buco del Piombo.

People
Giuseppe Terragni (1904–1943), an architect and pioneer of the Italian modern movement who also designed Como's Casa del Fascio, a significant example of Fascist architecture in northern Italy.

Twin towns
 Fellbach,  Germany
 Tain-l'Hermitage,  France
 Tournon-sur-Rhône,  France
 Cortale,  Italy

References

External links
 Official website

Cities and towns in Lombardy
Populated places on Brianza